Chan Soo Sen (born 1 October 1956) is a Singaporean former politician from the People's Action Party. He was the Member of Parliament representing the Joo Chiat ward in the East Coast Group Representation Constituency from 1997 to 2001 and the Joo Chiat Single Member Constituency from 2001 to 2011.

Career 
Chan also served as chief executive officer of the China-Singapore Suzhou Industrial Park Development Co Ltd between 1994 to 1996.

Political career 
Chan represented East Coast GRC between 1996 to 2001. 

In the 2001 general elections, he defeated Ooi Boon Ewe, an independent candidate, with 83.55% of the votes in the same SMC.

In the 2006 general elections, Chan, representing PAP, defeated Tan Bing Seng of the Workers' Party of Singapore with 65.01% of the votes in the SMC.

In March 2011, Chan announced his retirement from politics.

References

External links
CVs of MPs

1956 births
Members of the Parliament of Singapore
Singaporean people of Hokkien descent
People's Action Party politicians
Catholic High School, Singapore alumni
Living people
Nan Chiau High School alumni